The 2010 Skycity Triple Crown was the seventh race meeting of the 2010 V8 Supercar Championship Series. It featured Races 13 and 14 of the series and was held on the weekend of 18–20 June at Hidden Valley Raceway, in Darwin, in the Northern Territory, Australia.

Race 13
In provisional qualifying Jason Richards returned to the scene of his 2009 pole position and took fastest away from Jamie Whincup late in the session. Into the shoot out Tim Slade surprised many by briefly topping the session until Mark Winterbottom secured pole position with Jamie Whincup second. Beside Slade in fourth was Garth Tander.

Winterbottom won the start from Whincup, Tander, Slade, Courtney, Dumbrell, Van Gisbergen and Jason Richards while Will Davison limped around the track with his newly finished Commodore stuck in gear. Dumbrell lost ground in the early running dropping to ninth. Reindler dropped out of the race with a broken steering arm after a miserable qualifying session.

Winterbottom and Whincup built a gap on the field. Winterbottom was an early race stopper, followed by teammate Paul Dumbrell. Lowndes also stopped early, while Davison pitted again still with mechanical issues. Courtney, Todd Kelly and Lee Holdsworth followed shortly. Whincup continued out in front for two laps before he stopped with Tander following. After the stops Winterbottom emerged with an enlarged lead over Whincup while the first car in Jason Richards leapt up the order. Tander rejoined just in front of Courtney and Dumbrell with Slade jumping in front of Dumbrell. Van Gisbergen and Todd Kelly were close behind. Greg Murphy.

Steven Richards car failed to restart after a pitstops. Van Gisbergen was a mover in the middle part of the race, picking off Slade and Courtney, while a set-up change allowed Lowndes to start moving up the order after a slow start to the race. Last to pit was Russell Ingall, who led in his final laps prior to his pitstop. Van Gisbergen took Tander on lap 26. Six laps later Van Gisbergen claimed third from Jason Richards. Late in the race there was a couple of minor contact incidents. Dean Fiore was tipped wide over the back of the circuit. Russell Ingall clashed with Rick Kelly and Michael Caruso tipped Jonathon Webb into a spin. Lap 37 saw Tander spear off the track at the first turn, dumping himself from fifth to tenth.

Winterbottom hung on to win from Whincup, Van Gisbergen, Jason Richards and James Courtney. Tim Slade had a career best performance to finish sixth ahead of Lowndes, Dumbrell, Todd Kelly and Tander.

Race 14
Alex Davison won the start from his first pole position with Todd Kelly, Whincup, Rick Kelly, Courtney, Will Davison, Holdsworth, D'Alberto, Winterbottom and Coulthard with Tander spearing off at the first turn and Dumbrell spinning at the exit of turn 1.

Todd Kelly was the first of the leaders to pit on lap 15, with brother Rick following a lap later, switching from soft to hard tyres. Courtney follow the following lap.

Alex Davison pitted on lap 21 for his first stop with Whincup following a lap later. After a 30 lap battle Courtney passed Todd Kelly for position on lap 31. Lap 37 saw Jamie Whincup complete his hunt down of race leader Alex Davison and the Commodore moved into the lead. Russell Ingall received the 'meatball' flag for a minor but persistent fluid leak at the back of his Commodore.

Lap 48 saw a problem with Craig Lowndes pitstop, the car was dropped with only three tyres on the car but the car was raised back on its jacks prior to Lowndes attempting to resume with the front left tyre missing. A lap later Alex Davison pulled into the pits with an electrical or electronic malady that was robbing the car of power after a career best race performance to that point. Davison was hauled into the bay, the team needing the space to pit teammate Shane van Gisbergen, any chance of a good result was gone.

As the race reached its closing laps, race leader Whincup, on fading hard tyres was being caught rapidly by Mark Winterbottom. On Lap 61 Lowndes took Jason Richards for fifth, lap 64 saw Van Gisbergen relieve Courtney of third.

Whincup hung on to win from a fast closing Winterbottom. Van Gisbergen took third from Courtney with five laps to go. Lowndes took fifth from Jason Richards with eight laps to go. Tim Slade worked his way past the Kelly brothers and Richards in the closing laps to finish sixth in a career best performance. Behind Richards Todd Kelly led home brother Rick with Steven Richards clawing past Will Davison for a long-awaited top ten finish. Down in 18th Murphy crossed the line with a damaged car but did not lose enough time for Garth Tander to pick up a spot after a poor Sunday race.

Results
Results as follows:

Qualifying Race 13
Qualifying timesheets:

Race 13
Race timesheets:

Qualifying Race 14
Qualifying timesheets:

Race 14

Race timesheets:

Standings
After race 14 of 26

Source

References

External links
Official series website
Official timing and results

Darwin
June 2010 sports events in Australia
Sport in Darwin, Northern Territory
2010s in the Northern Territory
Motorsport in the Northern Territory